Ignacio María Salcedo Sánchez (born 22 May 1947 in Madrid, Spain) is a former Spanish footballer.

He played for Atlético de Madrid between 1969 and 1977, winning the Spanish League in 1970, 1973, and 1976, the Spanish Cup in 1972 and 1976, and the Intercontinental Cup in 1975. He played in the 1974 European Cup Final, which Atlético lost.

Honours
 Atlético Madrid
Intercontinental Cup: 1974
Copa del Generalísimo: 1971-72,1975-76
Spanish League: 1969-70, 1972-73, 1976-77

External links
 
 NASL/ASL stats

1947 births
Living people
Footballers from Madrid
Spanish footballers
Spanish expatriate footballers
Atlético Madrid footballers
Toronto Blizzard (1971–1984) players
Southern California Lazers players
Spain amateur international footballers
Expatriate soccer players in Canada
Expatriate soccer players in the United States
La Liga players
North American Soccer League (1968–1984) players
American Soccer League (1933–1983) players
Spanish expatriate sportspeople in Canada
Spanish expatriate sportspeople in the United States
Association football defenders